The Kierkegaard Circle at Trinity College, University of Toronto, is a philosophical society founded in 1986 whose purpose is to promote the study of the philosophy and theology of Søren Kierkegaard in Canada.

References

External links 
Kierkegaard Circle website

Søren Kierkegaard
Philosophical societies in Canada
Organizations based in Toronto
1986 establishments in Ontario
University of Toronto